Humboldt-Schule may refer to any number of schools named after Alexander von Humboldt:

In Germany:
 Humboldtschule Bad Homburg
 Humboldt-Gymnasium Bad Pyrmont
 Humboldt-Gymnasium Berlin-Tegel (DE)
 Humboldtschule Bremerhaven, Oberschule (DE)
 Humboldt-Gymnasium Düsseldorf (DE)
 Humboldt-Realschule Eppelheim
 Humboldt-Schule Erfurt (DE)
 Frida-Levy-Gesamtschule (formerly Humboldtschule Essen, städt. Gymnasium) (DE)
 Humboldt-Gymnasium Gifhorn (DE)
 Humboldtschule Hannover (DE)
 Humboldt-Gymnasium Karlsruhe (DE)
 Humboldt-Schule Kiel (DE)
 Humboldt-Gymnasium Köln (DE)
 , a secondary school in Leipzig today known as "Humboldt-Schule, Gymnasium der Stadt Leipzig", originally called "Humboldtschule"
 Humboldtschule Magdeburg, formerly Domgymnasium Magdeburg (DE)
 Humboldt Gymnasium Nordhausen
 Humboldtschule Offenbach am Main, Grundschule
 Humboldt-Gymnasium Radeberg (DE)
 Humboldtgymnasium Solingen (DE)
 Humboldt-Gymnasium Trier (DE)
 Humboldt-Gymnasium Ulm (DE)
 Humboldt-Gymnasium Weimar (DE)

Historic schools:
 Humboldt-Akademie (DE) in Berlin

Schools outside of Germany:
 Colegio Humboldt or Humboldt-Schule (Costa Rica)
 Colégio Humboldt São Paulo
 Deutsche Humboldtschule Guayaquil

See also
 Deutsche Schule Alexander von Humboldt (disambiguation)
 Alexander-von-Humboldt-Schule (disambiguation)
 Liste Humboldt als Namensstifter (list of things named after Alexander von Humboldt)